Paul I (– ) was Emperor of Russia from 1796 until his assassination. Officially, he was the only son of Peter III and Catherine the Great, although Catherine hinted that he was fathered by her lover Sergei Saltykov. Paul remained overshadowed by his mother for most of his life. He adopted the laws of succession to the Russian throne—rules that lasted until the end of the Romanov dynasty and of the Russian Empire. He also intervened in the French Revolutionary Wars and toward the end of his reign, added Kartli and Kakheti in Eastern Georgia into the empire, which was confirmed by his son and successor Alexander I.

He was de facto Grand Master of the Order of Hospitallers from 1799 to 1801 and ordered the construction of a number of Maltese thrones. Paul's pro-German sentiments and unpredictable behavior made him unpopular among Russian nobility, and he was secretly assassinated by his own officers.

Early years
Paul was born in the Palace of Elizabeth of Russia, Saint Petersburg. His father, the future Emperor Peter III, was the nephew and heir apparent of the Empress. The last edition of Catherine's memoirs explained that Peter III was certainly Paul's father after all and why. She lied when hints about another father were written in the first edition, published by Hertzen. His mother, born the daughter of a minor German prince, would later depose her own husband (Paul's father) and reign in her own right as Catherine II, known to history as Catherine the Great.

Paul was taken almost immediately after birth from his mother by the Empress Elizabeth, whose overwhelming attention may have done him more harm than good. Once Catherine had done her duty in providing an heir to the throne, Elizabeth had no more use for her and Paul was taken from his mother at birth and allowed to see her only during very limited moments. In all events, the Russian Imperial court, first of Elizabeth and then of Catherine, was not an ideal home for a lonely, needy and often sickly boy. As a boy, he was reported to be intelligent and good-looking. His pug-nosed facial features in later life are attributed to an attack of typhus, from which he suffered in 1771. Paul was put in the charge of a trustworthy governor, Nikita Ivanovich Panin, and of competent tutors. Panin's nephew went on to become one of Paul's assassins. One of Paul's tutors, Poroshin, complained that he was "always in a hurry", acting and speaking without reflection.

Under Catherine II
Empress Elizabeth died in 1762, when Paul was 8 years old, and he became crown prince with the accession of his father to the throne as Peter III. However, within a matter of months, Paul's mother engineered a coup and not only deposed her husband but, for a long time, was believed to have had him killed by her supporters. It was later found that Peter III probably died due to a fit of apoplexy when exerting himself in a dispute with Prince Feodor, one of his jailers. Some historians believe that he was murdered by a vindictive Alexei Orlov. After the death of Peter III, Catherine then placed herself on the throne in a surpassingly grand and ostentatious coronation ceremony, for which event the Russian Imperial Crown was crafted by court jewellers. The 8-year-old Paul retained his position as crown prince.

In 1772, her son and heir, Paul, turned eighteen. Paul and his adviser, Panin, believed he was the rightful tsar of Russia, as the only son of Peter III. His adviser had also taught him that the rule of women endangered good leadership, which was why he was so interested in gaining the throne. Distracting him, Catherine took trouble to find Paul a wife among the minor princesses of the Holy Roman Empire. She chose Princess Wilhelmina of Hesse-Darmstadt, who acquired the Russian name "Natalia Alexeievna", a daughter of Ludwig IX, Landgrave of Hesse-Darmstadt. The bride's older sister, Frederika Louisa, was already married to the Crown Prince of Prussia. Around this time, Catherine allowed Paul to attend the council in order that he might be trained for his work as Emperor. Wilhelmina died in childbirth on 15 April 1776, three years after the wedding. It soon became even clearer to Catherine that Paul wanted power, including his separate court. There was talk of having both Paul and his mother co-rule Russia, but Catherine narrowly avoided it. A fierce rivalry began between them, as Catherine knew she could never truly trust her son, as his claim to her seat was superior to hers. Paul coveted his mother's position, and by the laws of succession prevalent then, it was rightfully his.

After her daughter-in-law's death, Catherine began work forthwith on the project of finding another wife for Paul, and on 7 October 1776, less than six months after the death of his first wife, Paul married again. The bride was the beautiful Sophia Dorothea of Württemberg, who received the new Orthodox name Maria Feodorovna. Their first child, Alexander, was born in 1777, within a year of the wedding, and on this occasion the Empress gave Paul an estate, Pavlovsk. Paul and his wife gained leave to travel through western Europe in 1781–1782. In 1783, the Empress granted him another estate, Gatchina Palace, where he was allowed to maintain a brigade of soldiers whom he drilled on the Prussian model, an unpopular stance at the time.

Relationship with Catherine the Great
Catherine and her son and heir Paul maintained a distant relationship throughout her reign. The aunt of Catherine's husband, Empress Elizabeth, took up the child as a passing fancy. Elizabeth proved an obsessive but incapable caretaker, as she had raised no children of her own. Paul was supervised by a variety of caregivers. Roderick McGrew briefly relates the neglect to which the infant heir was sometimes subject: "On one occasion he fell out of his crib and slept the night away unnoticed on the floor." Even after Elizabeth's death, relations with Catherine hardly improved. Paul was often jealous of the favours she would shower upon her lovers. In one instance, the empress gave to one of her favourites 50,000 rubles on her birthday, while Paul received a cheap watch. Paul's early isolation from his mother created a distance between them that later events would reinforce. She never considered inviting him to share her power in governing Russia. And once Paul's son Alexander was born, it appeared that she had found a more suitable heir. The use made of his name by the rebel Yemelyan Pugachev, who impersonated his father Peter, tended no doubt to render Paul's position more difficult.

Catherine's absolute power and the delicate balance of courtier status greatly influenced the relationship at Court with Paul, who openly disregarded his mother's opinions. Paul adamantly protested his mother's policies, writing a veiled criticism in his Reflections, a dissertation on military reform. In it he directly disparaged expansionist warfare in favour of a more defensive military policy. Unenthusiastically received by his mother, Reflections appeared a threat to her authority and added weight to her suspicion of an internal conspiracy with Paul at its centre. For a courtier to have openly supported or shown intimacy towards Paul, especially following this publication, would have meant political suicide.

Paul spent the following years away from the Imperial Court, content to remain at his private estates at Gatchina Palace with his growing family and perform Prussian drill exercises. As Catherine grew older, she became less concerned that her son attend court functions; her attentions focused primarily on the future Emperor Alexander I.

It was not until 1787 that Catherine may have in fact decided to exclude her son from succession. After Alexander and his brother Constantine were born, she had them placed under her charge, just as Elizabeth had done with Paul. That Catherine grew to favour Alexander as sovereign of Russia rather than Paul is unsurprising. She met secretly with Alexander's tutor de La Harpe to discuss his pupil's ascension, and attempted to convince Alexander's mother Maria to sign a proposal authorizing her son's legitimacy. Both efforts proved fruitless, and though Alexander agreed to his grandmother's wishes, he remained respectful of his father's position as immediate successor to the Russian throne.

Accession to the throne
Catherine suffered a stroke on 17 November 1796, and died without regaining consciousness. Paul's first act as Emperor was to inquire about and, if possible, destroy her testament, as he feared it would exclude him from succession and leave the throne to Alexander. These fears may have contributed to Paul's promulgation of the Pauline Laws, which established the strict principle of primogeniture in the House of Romanov, leaving the throne to the next male heir. As emperor, Paul sought revenge for the deposition of his father, and the coup of his mother.

The army, then poised to attack Persia in accordance with Catherine's last design, was recalled to the capital within one month of Paul's accession.  Upon his death in 1762, Peter had been buried without any honors in the Annunciation Church at the Alexander Nevsky Monastery in St. Petersburg. Immediately after the death of his mother, Paul ordered his father's remains transferred, first to the church in the Winter Palace and then to the Peter and Paul Cathedral in St. Petersburg, the burial site of the Romanovs. 60-year-old Count Alexei Orlov, who had played a role in deposing Peter III and possibly also in his death, was made to walk in the funeral cortege, holding the Imperial Crown of Russia as he walked in front of Peter's coffin. Peter III had never been crowned so at the time of his reburial, Paul personally performed the ritual of coronation on his remains. Paul responded to the rumour of his illegitimacy by parading his descent from Peter the Great. The inscription on the monument to the first Emperor of Russia near the St. Michael's Castle reads in Russian "To the Great-Grandfather from the Great-Grandson". This is an allusion to the Latin "PETRO PRIMO CATHARINA SECUNDA", the dedication by Catherine on the 'Bronze Horseman' of Peter the Great.

Purported eccentricities

Emperor Paul was idealistic and capable of great generosity, but he was also mercurial and capable of vindictiveness. In spite of doubts of his legitimacy, he greatly resembled his father, Peter III, and other Romanovs as well and shared the same character. During the first year of his reign, Paul emphatically reversed many of his mother's policies. Although he accused many of Jacobinism, he allowed Catherine's best known critic, Radishchev, to return from Siberian exile. Besides Radishchev, he liberated Novikov from Schlüsselburg fortress, and also Tadeusz Kościuszko, yet after liberation both were confined to their own estates under police supervision. He viewed the Russian nobility as decadent and corrupt, and was determined to transform them into a disciplined, principled, loyal caste resembling a medieval chivalric order. To those few who conformed to his view of a modern-day knight (e.g., his favourites Kutuzov, Arakcheyev, and Rostopchin) he granted more serfs during the five years of his reign than his mother had presented to her lovers during her thirty-four years. Those who did not share his chivalric views were dismissed or lost their places at court: seven field marshals and 333 generals fell into this category.

Paul made several idiosyncratic and deeply unpopular attempts to reform the army. Under Catherine's reign, Grigori Potemkin introduced new uniforms that were cheap, comfortable, and practical, and designed in a distinctly Russian style. Paul decided to fulfill his father Peter III's intention of introducing Prussian uniforms. Impractical for active duty, these were deeply unpopular with the men, as was the effort required to maintain them. His love of parades and ceremony was not well-liked either. He ordered that Wachtparad ("Watch parades") take place early every morning in the parade ground of the palace, regardless of the weather conditions. He attempted to reform the organization of the army in 1796 by introducing The Infantry Codes, a series of guidelines for the army based largely upon show and glamour. But his greatest commander, Suvorov, completely ignored them, believing them to be worthless. At great expense, he built three palaces in or around the Russian capital. Much was made of his courtly love affair with Anna Lopukhina.

Emperor Paul also ordered the bones of Grigori Potemkin, the famed military commander and one of his mother's lovers, dug out of their grave and scattered.

Foreign affairs
Paul's early foreign policy can largely be seen as reactions against his mother's. In foreign policy, this meant that he opposed the many expansionary wars she fought and instead preferred to pursue a more peaceful, diplomatic path. Immediately upon taking the throne, he recalled all troops outside Russian borders, including the struggling expedition Catherine II had sent to conquer Iran through the Caucasus and the 60,000 men she had promised to Britain and Austria to help them defeat the French. Paul hated the French before their revolution, and afterwards, with their republican and anti-religious views, he detested them even more. In addition to this, he knew French expansion hurt Russian interests, but he recalled his mother's troops primarily because he firmly opposed wars of expansion. He also believed that Russia needed substantial governmental and military reforms to avoid an economic collapse and a revolution, before Russia could wage war on foreign soil.

Paul offered to mediate between Austria and France through Prussia and pushed Austria to make peace, but the two countries made peace without his assistance, signing the Treaty of Campoformio in October 1797. This treaty, with its affirmation of French control over islands in the Mediterranean and the partitioning of the Republic of Venice, upset Paul, who saw it as creating more instability in the region and displaying France's ambitions in the Mediterranean. In response, he offered asylum to the Prince de Condé and his army, as well as the future Louis XVIII, both of whom had been forced out of Austria by the treaty. By this point, the French Republic had seized Italy, the Netherlands, and Switzerland, establishing republics with constitutions in each, and Paul felt that Russia now needed to play an active role in Europe in order to overthrow what the republic had created and restore traditional authorities. In this goal he found a willing ally in the Austrian chancellor Baron Thugut, who hated the French and loudly criticized revolutionary principles. Britain and the Ottoman Empire joined Austria and Russia to stop French expansion, free territories under their control and re-establish the old monarchies. The only major power in Europe who did not join Paul in his anti-French campaign was Prussia, whose distrust of Austria and the security they got from their current relationship with France prevented them from joining the coalition. Despite the Prussians’ reluctance, Paul decided to move ahead with the war, promising 60,000 men to support Austria in Italy and 45,000 men to help England in North Germany and the Netherlands.

Another important factor in Paul's decision to go to war with France was the island of Malta, the home of the Knights Hospitaller. In addition to Malta, the Order had priories in the Catholic countries of Europe that held large estates and paid the revenue from them to the Order. In 1796, the Order approached Paul about the Priory of Poland, which had been in a state of neglect and paid no revenue for 100 years, and was now on Russian land. Paul as a child had read the histories of the Order and was impressed by their honor and connection to the old order it represented. He relocated the Priories of Poland to St. Petersburg in January 1797. The knights responded by making him a protector of the Order in August of that same year, an honour he had not expected but, in keeping with his chivalric ideals, he happily accepted.

In June 1798, Napoleon seized Malta; this greatly offended Paul. In September, the Priory of St. Petersburg declared that Grand Master Hompesch had betrayed the Order by selling Malta to Napoleon. A month later the Priory elected Paul Grand Master on 24 November 1798, according to the 1847 edition of the Glossary of Heraldry. This election resulted in the establishment of the Russian tradition of the Knights Hospitaller within the Imperial Orders of Russia. The election of the sovereign of an Orthodox nation as the head of a Catholic order was controversial, and it was some time before the Holy See or any of the Order's other priories approved it. This delay created political issues between Paul, who insisted on defending his legitimacy, and the priories’ respective countries. Though recognition of Paul's election would become a more divisive issue later in his reign, the election immediately gave Paul, as Grand Master of the Order, another reason to fight the French Republic: to reclaim the Order's ancestral home.

The Russian army in Italy played the role of an auxiliary force sent to support the Austrians, though the Austrians offered the position of chief commander over all the allied armies to Alexander Suvorov, a distinguished Russian general. Under Suvorov, the allies managed to push the French out of Italy, though they suffered heavy losses. However, by this point in time, cracks had started to appear in the Russo-Austrian alliance, due to their different goals in Italy. While Paul and Suvorov wanted the liberation and restoration of the Italian monarchies, the Austrians sought territorial acquisitions in Italy, and were willing to sacrifice later Russian support to acquire them. The Austrians, therefore, happily saw Suvorov and his army out of Italy in 1799 to go meet up with the army of Alexander Korsakov, at the time assisting the Austrian Archduke Charles to expel the French armies currently occupying Switzerland. However, the campaign in Switzerland had become a stalemate, without much activity on either side until the Austrians withdrew. Because this happened before Korsakov and Suvorov could unite their forces, the French could attack their armies one at a time, destroying Korsakov's and forcing Suvorov to fight his way out of Switzerland, suffering heavy losses. Suvorov, shamed, blamed the Austrians for the terrible defeat in Switzerland, as did his furious sovereign. This defeat, combined with Austria's refusal to reinstate the old monarchies in Italy and their disrespect of the Russian flag during the taking of Ancona, led to the formal cessation of the alliance in October 1799.

Although by the fall of 1799 the Russo-Austrian alliance had more or less fallen apart, Paul still cooperated willingly with the British. Together, they planned to invade the Netherlands, and through that country attack France proper. Unlike Austria, neither Russia nor Britain appeared to have any secret territorial ambitions: they both simply sought to defeat the French.

The Anglo-Russian invasion of Holland started well, with a British victory - the Battle of Callantsoog (27 August 1799) - in the north, but when the Russian army arrived in September, the allies found themselves faced with bad weather, poor coordination, and unexpectedly fierce resistance from the Dutch and the French, and their success evaporated. As the month wore on, the weather worsened and the allies suffered more and more losses, eventually signing an armistice in October 1799. The Russians suffered three-quarters of allied losses and the British left the Russian troops on an island in the Channel after the retreat, as Britain did not want them on the mainland. This defeat and subsequent maltreating of Russian troops strained Russo-British relations, but a definitive break did not occur until later. The reasons for this break are less clear and simple than those of the split with Austria, but several key events occurred over the winter of 1799–1800 that helped: Bonaparte released 7,000 captive Russian troops that Britain had refused to pay the ransom for; Paul grew closer to the Scandinavian countries of Denmark and Sweden, whose claim to neutral shipping rights offended Britain; Paul had the British ambassador in St. Petersburg (Whitworth) recalled (1800) and Britain did not replace him, without any clear reason given as to why; and Britain, needing to choose between their two allies, chose Austria, who had with certainty committed to fighting the French to the end.

Finally, two events occurred in rapid succession that destroyed the alliance completely: first, in July 1800, the British seized a Danish frigate, prompting Paul to close the British trading factories in St. Petersburg as well as impound British ships and cargo; second, even though the allies resolved this crisis, Paul could not forgive the British for Admiral Nelson's refusal to return Malta to the Order of St. John, and therefore to Paul, when the British captured it from the French in September 1800. In a drastic response, Paul seized all British vessels in Russian ports, sent their crews to detention camps and took British traders hostage until he received satisfaction. Over the next winter, he went further, using his new Armed Neutrality coalition with Sweden, Denmark and Prussia to prepare the Baltic against possible British attack, prevent the British from searching neutral merchant vessels, and freeze all British trade in Northern Europe. As France had already closed all of Western and Southern Europe to British trade, Britain, which relied heavily upon imports (especially for timber, naval products, and grain) felt seriously threatened by Paul's move and reacted fast. In March 1801, Britain sent a fleet to Denmark, bombarding Copenhagen and forcing the Danes to surrender in the beginning of April. Nelson then sailed towards St. Petersburg, reaching Reval (14 May 1801), but after the conspiracy assassinated Paul (23 March 1801), the new Tsar Alexander opened peace-negotiations shortly after taking the throne.

The most original aspect of Paul I's foreign policy was his rapprochement with France after the coalition fell apart. Several scholars have argued that this change in position, radical though it seemed, made sense, as Bonaparte became First Consul and made France a more conservative state, consistent with Paul's view of the world. Paul also decided to send a Cossack army to take British India, as Britain itself was almost impervious to direct attack, being an island nation with a formidable navy, but the British had left India largely unguarded and would have great difficulty staving off a force that came over land to attack it. The British themselves considered this enough of a problem that they signed three treaties with Persia, in 1801, 1809 and 1812, to guard against an army attacking India through Central Asia. Paul sought to attack the British where they were weakest: through their commerce and their colonies. Throughout his reign, his policies focused reestablishing peace and the balance of power in Europe, while supporting autocracy and old monarchies, without seeking to expand Russia's borders.

Irano-Georgian matters

In lieu of Russia's failure to honour the terms of the Treaty of Georgievsk, Qajar Iran reinvaded Georgia and captured and sacked Tbilisi. Georgian rulers felt they had nowhere else to turn now as Georgia was again re-subjugated by Iran. Tbilisi was captured and burnt to the ground, and eastern Georgia reconquered. However, Agha Mohammad Khan, Persia's ruler, was assassinated in 1797 in Shusha, after which the Persian grip on Georgia softened again. Erekle, King of Kartli-Kakheti, still dreaming of a united Georgia, died a year later. After his death, a civil war broke out over the succession to the throne of Kartli-Kakheti, and one of the rival candidates called on Russia to intervene and decide matters. On 8 January 1801, Tsar Paul I signed a decree on the incorporation of Georgia (Kartli-Kakheti) within the Russian Empire, which was confirmed by Tsar Alexander I on 12 September 1801. The Georgian envoy in Saint Petersburg, Garsevan Chavchavadze, reacted with a note of protest that was presented to the Russian vice-chancellor Alexander Kurakin. In May 1801, Russian General Carl Heinrich von Knorring removed the Georgian heir to the throne, David Batonishvili, from power and deployed a provisional government headed by General Ivan Lazarev.

Some of the Georgian nobility did not accept the decree until April 1802, when General Knorring held the nobility in Tbilisi's Sioni Cathedral and forced them to take an oath on the imperial crown of Russia. Those who disagreed were arrested. Wanting to secure the northernmost reaches of his empire, and aware that the grip on Georgia was drastically loosening with Russia's formal entrance into Tbilisi, Agha Mohammad Khan's successor, Fath Ali Shah Qajar, got involved in the Russo-Persian War (1804-1813). In the summer of 1805, Russian troops on the Askerani River and near Zagam defeated the Persian army. In 1810, the kingdom of Imereti (Western Georgia) was annexed by the Russian Empire after the suppression of King Solomon II's resistance. In 1813, Qajar Iran was officially forced to cede Georgia to Russia per the Treaty of Gulistan of 1813. This marked the official start of the Russian period in Georgia.

Assassination
Paul's premonitions of assassination were well founded. His attempts to force the nobility to adopt a code of chivalry alienated many of his trusted advisors. The Emperor also discovered outrageous machinations and corruption in the Russian treasury. As he had revoked Catherine's decree allowing corporal punishment of the free classes, and directed reforms that resulted in greater rights for the peasantry and provided for better treatment for serfs on agricultural estates, many of his policies greatly annoyed the nobility and induced his enemies to work out a plan of action.

A conspiracy was organized, some months before it was executed, by Counts Peter Ludwig von der Pahlen, Nikita Petrovich Panin, and Admiral de Ribas, with the alleged support of the British ambassador in Saint Petersburg, Charles Whitworth.

The assassins included General Bennigsen, a Hanoverian in the Russian service, and General Yashvil, a Georgian. They charged into Paul's bedroom, flushed with drink after dining together, and found the emperor hiding behind some drapes in the corner. The conspirators pulled him out, forced him to the table, and tried to compel him to sign his abdication. Paul offered some resistance, and Nikolay Zubov struck him with a sword, after which the assassins strangled and trampled him to death. Paul's successor on the Russian throne, his 23-year-old son Alexander, was actually in the palace at the time of the killing; he had "given his consent to the overthrow of Paul, but had not supposed that this would be carried out by means of assassination". General Nikolay Zubov announced his accession to the heir, accompanied by the admonition, "Time to grow up! Go and rule!" Alexander I did not punish the assassins, and the court physician, James Wylie, declared apoplexy the official cause of death.

Legacy
There is some evidence that Paul I was venerated as a saint among the Russian Orthodox populace, even though he was never officially canonized by any of the Orthodox Churches.

Portrayals in popular culture
 In 1906, Dmitry Merezhkovsky published his tragedy Paul I; the most prominent performance of which was made on the Soviet Army Theatre's stage in 1989, with Oleg Borisov as Paul.
 The Patriot (1928 film), directed by Ernst Lubitsch, is a biopic starring Emil Jannings as Paul. It won the Best Writing Oscar at the 2nd Academy Awards. It is now mostly lost, with about one-third of the film preserved in archives.
 The Soviet film Lieutenant Kijé (1937), directed by Aleksandr Faintsimmer and based on a novella of the same name by Yury Tynyanov, satirizes Paul's obsession with rigid drill, instant obedience, and martinet discipline.
 In Sartre's novel Nausea (1938), Marquis de Rollebon, a fictional character being studied by the protagonist Antoine Roquentin, is implicit in Paul I's assassination.
 The Soviet experimental film Assa (1987) has a subplot revolving around Paul's murder; Paul is portrayed by Dmitry Dolinin.
 Poor Poor Paul (2003; Бе́дный бе́дный Па́вел) is a film about Paul's rule produced by Lenfilm, directed by Vitaliy Mel'nikov, and starring Viktor Sukhorukov as Paul and Oleg Yankovsky as Count Pahlen, who headed the conspiracy against him. The film portrays Paul more compassionately than the long-existing stories about him. The movie won the Michael Tariverdiev Prize for best music to a film at the Open Russian Film Festival Kinotavr, in 2003.
 The young Paul appears in the 2014 Russia-1 television series Ekaterina and features heavily as a main character in its second and third seasons.
 The young Paul is portrayed by Joseph Quinn in the 2019 HBO mini-series Catherine the Great.

Archives
Paul's letters to his first mother-in-law, Countess Palatine Caroline of Zweibrücken, (together with letters from his first wife to her mother) are preserved in the Hessian State Archive (Hessisches Staatsarchiv Darmstadt) in Darmstadt, Germany. In addition, Paul's letters to his first father-in-law, Louis IX, Landgrave of Hesse-Darmstadt, (together with letters from his first wife to her father) are also preserved in the Hessian State Archive in Darmstadt. 

Paul's correspondence with his brother-in-law, King Frederick I of Württemberg (Maria Feodorovna's brother), written between 1776 and 1801, is preserved in the State Archive of Stuttgart (Hauptstaatsarchiv Stuttgart) in Stuttgart, Germany. Paul's correspondence with his parents-in-law, Frederick II Eugene, Duke of Württemberg, and Friederike of Brandenburg-Schwedt, written between 1776 and 1797, is also preserved in the State Archive of Stuttgart.

Issue
Paul and Sophie had ten children; nine survived to adulthood (and from whom can be traced 19 grandchildren):

Mistresses and illegitimate children 
Sophia Razumovskaya  (1746–1803), lady in waiting of Catherine the Great.
Semyon Afanasyevich Velikiy (1772 – 13 August 1794)– became a naval officer and died in ship wreck.
Mavra Yuryeva (1760–1828), spouse of Aleksey Vakar
Marfa Pavlovna Musina-Yuryeva (1801–1803) – died prematurely

Ancestry

See also
 Manifesto of three-day corvee
 Tsars of Russia family tree

Notes

References

Attribution

Bibliography

 
 
 
 
 
 
 
 
  online review

External links 

 Paul I of Russia at AlexanderPalace.org
 

 
18th-century Russian monarchs
19th-century murdered monarchs
19th-century Russian monarchs
1754 births
1801 deaths
Assassinated politicians of the Russian Empire
Burials at Saints Peter and Paul Cathedral, Saint Petersburg
Children of Catherine the Great
Deaths by strangulation
Dukes of Holstein-Gottorp
Eastern Orthodox monarchs
Grand Masters of the Knights Hospitaller
House of Holstein-Gottorp-Romanov
Knights of Malta
Male murder victims
Murdered Russian monarchs
Royalty from Saint Petersburg
People of the Russo-Persian Wars
Russian emperors
Russian grand dukes
Tsesarevichs of Russia
Sons of emperors
1801 murders in the Russian Empire
Murder in the Russian Empire